Bradley David Havens (born November 17, 1959) is a former Major League Baseball pitcher for the Minnesota Twins (1981–83), Baltimore Orioles (1985–86), Los Angeles Dodgers (1987–88), Cleveland Indians (1988–89) and Detroit Tigers (1989).

Career
At Kimball High School, Brad Havens wore No. 26 and played for Coach Frank Clouser at Royal Oak Kimball High School. Havens threw a no-hitter in the 1977 district championship for Kimball, which went to four Class A title games in 10 years from 1971 to 1980. Havens formed a tough one-two left-handed pitching punch with fellow Kimball hurler Steve Manderfield during his years on the varsity at Kimball. Havens was selected in the 8th round by the California Angels  and Manderfield was chosen by the Milwaukee Brewers in the 12th round of the 1977 Major League baseball amateur draft.

Havens was later acquired by the Minnesota Twins (along with outfielder Ken Landreaux, catcher/first baseman Dave Engle, and right-handed pitcher Paul Hartzell) in exchange for Rod Carew. He made his major league debut with the Twins at Tiger Stadium, just three weeks before the 1981 players' strike, and finished 9th in voting for 1981 American League Rookie of the Year for having a 3–6 Win–loss record, 14 Games, 12 Games Started, 1 Complete Game, 1 Shutout, 1 Game Finished, 78 Innings Pitched, 76 Hits Allowed, 33 Runs Allowed, 31 Earned Runs Allowed, 6 Home Runs Allowed, 24 Walks Allowed, 43 Strikeouts, 1 Hit Batsmen, 1 Wild Pitch, 323 Batters Faced, 4 Intentional Walks, 2 Balks and a 3.58 ERA. Havens was the opening day starter for the Twins in 1983, at home against the Detroit Tigers, but after posting a 5-8 record with an ERA of 8.18, he never appeared in a Twins uniform again.

Although the rest of his career was entirely unremarkable, Havens was voted a full-share bonus and awarded a player's ring by his fellow former teammates for his limited role (0-0, 4.66 ERA) in the Los Angeles Dodgers' 1988 championship season. Havens, who prepped at Royal Oak (MI) Kimball High School, joined Kirk Gibson, who graduated from Waterford (MI) Kettering as two metro Detroit natives on that World Series team.

In eight years, Havens had a 24–37 Win–loss record, 205 Games, 61 Games Started, 6 Complete Games, 2 Shutouts, 63 Games Finished, 3 Saves,  Innings Pitched, 624 Hits Allowed, 336 Runs Allowed, 316 Earned Runs Allowed, 76 Home Runs Allowed, 246 Walks Allowed, 370 Strikeouts, 5 Hit Batsmen, 21 Wild Pitches, 2,580 Batters Faced, 31 Intentional Walks, 7 Balks and a 4.81 ERA.

Defensively, Havens was very good, handling 86 of 87 total chances successfully for a .989 fielding percentage.

External links

1959 births
Living people
Major League Baseball pitchers
Minnesota Twins players
Baltimore Orioles players
Cleveland Indians players
Detroit Tigers players
Baseball players from Michigan
Quad Cities Angels players
Orlando Twins players
Wisconsin Rapids Twins players
Visalia Oaks players
Toledo Mud Hens players
Rochester Red Wings players
Albuquerque Dukes players
Colorado Springs Sky Sox players